Concórdia Atlético Clube, usually known simply as Concórdia, is a Brazilian football club from Concórdia, Santa Catarina.

History
Founded on 2 March 2005, Concórdia first appeared in the top tier of the Campeonato Catarinense in 2011 after finishing second in the second tier of the previous year; the club, however, subsequently suffered relegation. In June 2012, the club confirmed their place in the year's Campeonato Brasileiro Série D, but was knocked out in the first phase.

References

External links
 
Ogol team profile 

Association football clubs established in 2005
2005 establishments in Brazil
Football clubs in Santa Catarina (state)